Buck Taylor (born May 13, 1938) is an American actor and artist, best known for his role as gunsmith-turned-deputy Newly O'Brian in the CBS television series Gunsmoke. He is the son of Florence Gertrude Heffernan and character actor Dub Taylor. Taylor graduated from North Hollywood High School, where he became a talented gymnast. Actor Guinn "Big Boy" Williams sponsored him to go to the U.S. Olympic Trials as a gymnast, but he failed to qualify for the 1960 Summer Olympics. He served two years in the United States Navy.

His first important acting role was as Trooper Shattuck in the 1961 Dick Powell's Zane Grey Theatre episode "Image of a Drawn Sword". His other early roles were in a 1964 episode of The Outer Limits entitled "Don’t Open Till Doomsday", and as John Bradford (Brad) in four episodes of the 1966 ABC Western series The Monroes.

Gunsmoke

From 1967 to 1975, Taylor played Newly O'Brian in the television series Gunsmoke. He replaced deputy marshal Clayton Thaddeus Greenwood, played by Roger Ewing, after he had left the show. The character came to Dodge City as a gunsmith, and later became a deputy marshal. He reprised his role in the 1987 television movie Gunsmoke: Return to Dodge, where he played the city's marshal.

In 1981, the National Cowboy & Western Heritage Museum inducted Taylor into the Cowboy Hall of Fame, and awarded him the Trustee Award for his performance on Gunsmoke.

Artwork

Taylor attended the Chouinard Art Institute, and has been selling his watercolor and acrylic paintings of cowboys, Native Americans, and horses since 1993. Many of his paintings are of characters and scenes from movies and television series in which he has appeared. These images are made into prints, which are sold in various sizes. He is the official artist for many rodeos and state fairs, and creates their promotional posters.

Filmography

Film

 1966 - The Wild Angels as Dear John
 1976 - Pony Express Rider as Bovey Kingman
 1978 - Beartooth
 1981 - The Legend of the Lone Ranger as Robert Edward Gattlin
 1981 - Cattle Annie and Little Britches as Dyamite Dick
 1983 - Triumphs of a Man Called Horse as Sgt. Bridger
 1984 - No Man's Land as Feeny
 1990 - Big Bad John as Bob Simmons
 1991 - Conagher as Tile Coker
 1993 - Gettysburg as Colonel William Gamble
 1993 - Tombstone as “Turkey Creek” Jack Johnson
 1998 - Hard Time as Capt. Adam Gunther
 2003 - Gods and Generals as General Maxcy Gregg
 2005 - Truce as Harry Dodds
 2006 - Flicka as Wagner
 2007 - The Mist as Ambrose Cornell
 2011 - Cowboys & Aliens as Wes Claibourne
 2017 - The Road to Valhalla as Union Veteran
 2016 - Indiscretion as Abe
 2016 - Hell or High Water as Old Man
 2019 - Trading Paint'' as Ben

Television

References

1938 births
Living people
American male television actors
Chouinard Art Institute alumni
North Hollywood High School alumni
Male actors from Hollywood, Los Angeles
20th-century American male actors
Western (genre) television actors